Knock Dem Dead is an album by the Montserratian soca musician Arrow, released in 1988. It was Arrow's first album to be widely distributed in the United States. The song "Groove Master" appears on the soundtracks to Casual Sex? and The Mighty Quinn.

Production
The album was produced by Leston Paul. It incorporated more traditional rock elements, with the guitar of Chris Newland featured more prominently.

Critical reception

The Gazette wrote that "there's no escaping Arrow's wicked and distinctive beat, influenced here by everything from Latin rhythms to New York rap." The Boston Globe deemed the album "juiced-up bacchanal music with driving guitar lines, ever-present horn bursts and Arrow's high-energy vocals which show a preacher-like devotion to the dance floor." The Chicago Tribune ranked Knock Dem Dead at number two on its list of the 10 best albums of 1988, writing that it "proved that when it comes to accessible, catchy and joyously rhythmic music, [Arrow] has few equals." The Reggae & African Beat called "Groove Master" Arrow's "masterpiece."

Track listing

Personnel
Arrow - vocals
Chris Newland - guitar
Leston Paul - keyboards, production

References

1988 albums
soca albums